Vilda Musen, "The Wild Mouse", is a roller coaster at Gröna Lund in Stockholm, Sweden. It is the tallest wild mouse roller coaster in the world, as well as one of the fastest.

External links
Vilda Musen info on Gröna Lund home page

Roller coasters in Sweden
Roller coasters introduced in 2003
Wild Mouse roller coasters
Gröna Lund